Hasle is a station on the Oslo Metro system located in the Grünerløkka borough between Carl Berners plass and Økern. It is the first outdoor station on Grorud Line after the downtown tunnel. After completion of the Ring Line in 2006, Hasle is the first station on the Grorud Line not shared with another line. There is some residential housing in the vicinity, as well as some industry.

References

External links

Oslo Metro stations in Oslo
Railway stations opened in 1966
1966 establishments in Norway